Kancoona is a locality in northeast Victoria, Australia in the Kiewa Valley,  northeast of the state capital, Melbourne. At the 2006 census, Kancoona had a population of 210.

Kancoona Post Office opened on 3 December 1923 and closed in 1968.

References

Towns in Victoria (Australia)
Alpine Shire